Katarina Jukic (born 23 November 1989) is an Australian football (soccer) player who played for Australian W-League team Perth Glory, and for Murdoch University Melville in the Women's NPL. She is the sister of Western Knights player Andrija Jukic.

In October 2020, Jukic gained attention for a goal scored while playing for Murdoch University Melville; she performed a rabona to score a goal from outside of the penalty area.

Jukic departed Perth Glory ahead of the 2021–22 A-League Women season.

Honours
Personal honours

In both 2017 and 2018, she was awarded the Women's Premier Best Female Player.

References

1989 births
Living people
Australian women's soccer players
Sportswomen from Western Australia
Perth Glory FC (A-League Women) players
A-League Women players
Australian people of Croatian descent
Soccer players from Perth, Western Australia
Women's association football midfielders
Women's association football forwards